The dollar sign, also known as peso sign, is a symbol consisting of a capital "S" crossed with one or two vertical strokes ($ or  depending on typeface), used to indicate the unit of various currencies around the world, including most currencies denominated "peso" and "dollar". The explicitly double-barred  sign is called cifrão in Portuguese. 

The sign is also used in several compound currency symbols, such as the Brazilian real (R$) and the Nicaraguan córdoba (C$).

The one- and two-stroke version are often considered mere stylistic (typeface) variants, although in some places and epochs one of them may have been specifically assigned, by law or custom, to a specific currency. The Unicode computer encoding standard defines a single code for both.

In most English-speaking countries that use that symbol, it is placed to the left of the amount specified, e.g. "$1", read as "one dollar".

History

Use for the Spanish American peso in the late 1700s
The symbol appears in business correspondence in the 1770s from Spanish America, the early independent U.S., British America and Britain, referring to the Spanish American peso, also known as "Spanish dollar" or "piece of eight" in British America. Those coins provided the model for the currency that the United States adopted in 1792, and for the larger coins of the new Spanish American republics, such as the Mexican peso, Argentine peso, Peruvian real, and Bolivian sol coins.

With the Coinage Act of 1792, the United States Congress created the U.S. dollar, defining it to have "the value of a Spanish milled dollar as the same is now current" but a variety of foreign coins were deemed to be legal tender until the Coinage Act of 1857 ended this status.

The earliest U.S. dollar coins did not have any dollar symbol. The first occurrence in print is claimed to be from 1790s, by a Philadelphia printer Archibald Binny, creator of the Monticello typeface. The $1 United States Note issued by the United States in 1869 included a large symbol consisting of a "U" with the right bar overlapping an "S" like a single-bar dollar sign, as well as a very small double-stroke dollar sign in the legal warning against forgery.

Earlier history of the symbol
It is still uncertain, however, how the dollar sign came to represent the Spanish American peso. There are currently several competing hypotheses:

  One theory holds that the sign grew out of the Spanish and Spanish American scribal abbreviation "ps" for pesos. A study of late 18th- and early 19th-century manuscripts shows that the s gradually came to be written over the p, developing into a close equivalent to the "$" mark.  However, there are documents showing the common use of the two-stroke version in Portugal already by 1775.

 Another hypothesis derives the sign from a depiction of the Pillars of Hercules, a classical symbol for two sides of the Strait of Gibraltar, with a ribbon wrapped around both each pillar (or both pillars) in the form of an "S". This device is common support element of the Spanish coat of arms, and appeared on the most common real de ocho coins circulating at the time in the Americas and Europe; namely, those minted at the Potosí mint in Bolivia, which operated from 1573 to 1825.

 A variant of the above theory claims that the sign comes from the mark of the mint at Potosí, where a large portion of the Spanish Empire's silver was mined, also featured on those coin, which consisted of the letters "P T S I" superimposed. The core of this monogram is a (single-stroked) "$" sign.

 Yet another hypothesis notes that the English word "dollar" for the Spanish piece of eight originally came (through Dutch daalder) from Joachimsthaler or thaler, a similar large German silver coin which was widely used in Europe.  It is therefore conjectured that the dollar sign derived from a symbol consisting of a superimposing S and I or J that was used to denote the German silver coin.  Such symbol appears in the 1686 edition of An Introduction to Merchants' Accounts by John Collins. Alternatively, the symbol could have come from a snake and cross emblem on the thaler coins.

Less likely theories
The following theories seem to have been discredited or contradicted by documentary evidence:

 Some historians have attributed the symbol to Oliver Pollock, a wealthy Irish trader and early supporter of the American Revolution, who used the abbreviation "ps", sometimes run together, in a letter dated 1778.
 In 1937, historian James Alton James claimed that the symbol with two strokes was an adapted design of patriot Robert Morris in 1778, in letters written to Pollock.
 In 1939, H. M. Larson suggested that the sign could derive from a combination of the Greek character "psi" (ψ) and "S".
 Writer Ayn Rand claimed in her 1957 book Atlas Shrugged that the sign started off as a monogram of "US", with a narrow "U" superimposed on the "S", which would have been used on money bags issued by the United States Mint. In her theory, the bottom part of the "U" would have been lost, producing the dollar sign with two vertical lines.
 Authors T. Seijas and J. Frederick noted that the captors of slaves in Spanish territories sometimes branded enslaved people with a symbol very similar to a one-barred dollar sign. Esclavo is Spanish for "slave," and clavo means nail. A dollar sign is S + clavo.
 A theory often cited in Portuguese speaking countries is that the "S" part of the doubly-stroked sign is a schematic representation of the path followed by the Umayyad Caliphate general Tariq Ibn Ziyad in his conquest of the Visigoth kingdom in 711 CE, and the two strokes represent the Pillars of Hercules that he would have crossed along that path. That symbol would have been engraved in coins commemorating his victory, and then became symbolic of currency in general.

Currencies that use the dollar sign

As symbol of the currency
The numerous currencies called "dollar" use the dollar sign to express money amounts. The sign is also generally used for the many currencies called "peso" (except the Philippine peso, which uses the symbol "₱"). Within a country the dollar/peso sign may be used alone. In other cases, and to avoid ambiguity in international usage, it is usually combined with other glyphs, e.g. CA$ or Can$ for Canadian dollar.

The dollar sign, alone or in combination with other glyphs, is or was used to denote several currencies with other names, including:

 Brazilian cruzeiro (various currencies, all defunct): ₢$, etc.
 Brazilian real: R$
 Ethiopian birr (until 1976): E$
 Macanese pataca: MOP$
 Nicaraguan córdoba: C$
 Samoan tālā (a transliteration of the word dollar): $
 Tongan paʻanga: T$
 Malaya and British Borneo dollar (1957–1967): $
 Malaysian ringgit (1967–1997): $,

Prefix or suffix
In the United States, Mexico, Australia, Argentina, New Zealand, Hong Kong, Pacific Island nations, and English-speaking Canada, the sign is written before the number ("$5"), even though the word is written or spoken after it ("five dollars", "cinco pesos"). In French-speaking Canada, exceptionally, the dollar symbol usually appears after the number, e.g., "". (The cent symbol is written after the number in most countries that use it, e.g., "5¢".)

Use in the Portuguese Empire
In Portugal, Brazil, and other parts of the Portuguese Empire, the two-stroke variant of the sign (with the name ; was used as the thousands separator of amounts in the national currency, the real (plural "réis", abbreviated "Rs."):  meant "".  This usage is attested in 1775, but may be older by a century or more. It is always written with two vertical lines: . It is the official sign of the Cape Verdean escudo (ISO 4217: CVE).

In 1911 Portugal redefined the national currency as the escudo, worth , and divided into 100 ; but the cifrão continued to be used as the decimal separator, so that  meant  or 123 escudos and 50 centavos. This usage ended in 2002 when the country switched to the euro. (A similar scheme to use a letter symbol instead of a decimal point is used by the RKM code in electrical engineering since 1952.)

Cape Verde, a republic and former Portuguese colony, similarly switched from the real to their local escudo and centavos in 1914, and retains the cifrão usage as decimals separator as of 2021. Local versions of the Portuguese escudo were for a time created also for other overseas colonies, including East Timor (1958–1975), Portuguese India (1958–1961), Angola (1914–1928 and 1958–1977), Mozambique (1914–1980), Portuguese Guinea (1914–1975), and São Tomé and Príncipe (1914–1977); presumably all using the cifrão as decimals separator.

Brazil retained the real and the cifrão as thousands separator until 1942, when it switched to the Brazilian cruzeiro, with comma as the decimals separator. The dollar sign, officially with one stroke but often rendered with two, was retained as part of the currency symbol , so one would write  for 13 cruzeiros and 50 centavos.

It was formerly used by the Portuguese escudo (ISO: PTE) before its replacement by the euro and by the Portuguese Timor escudo (ISO: TPE) before its replacement by the Indonesian rupiah and the US dollar. The name originates in the Arabic , meaning 'zero'.

One stroke vs. two strokes

In some places and at some times, the one- and two-stroke variants have been used in the same contexts to distinguish between the U.S. dollar and other local currency, such as the former Portuguese escudo.

However, such usage is not standardized, and furthermore the two versions are generally considered mere graphic variants of the same symbol—a typeface design choice.  Computer and typewriter keyboards usually have a single key for that sign, and many character encodings (including ASCII and Unicode) reserve a single numeric code for it. Indeed, dollar signs in the same digital document may be rendered with one or two strokes, if different computer fonts are used. Should that ambiguity be significant, one may use explicit abbreviations (like "" or "$NZ"), or ISO 4217 three-letter currency codes (such as USD and MXN) to distinguish different currencies that use the symbol.

When a specific variant is not mandated by law or custom, the choice is usually a matter of expediency or aesthetic preference. Both versions were used in the US in the 18th century. (An 1861 Civil War-era advertisement depicts the two-stroked symbol as a snake.)  The two-stroke version seems to be generally less popular today, though used in some "old-style" fonts like Baskerville.

Use in computer software 
Because of its use in early American computer applications such as business accounting, the dollar sign is almost universally present in computer character sets, and thus has been appropriated for many purposes unrelated to money in programming languages and command languages.

Encoding
The dollar sign "$" has Unicode code point U+0024 (inherited from ASCII via Latin-1).

 

There are no separate encodings for one- and two-line variants. The choice is typeface-dependent, they are allographs.  However, there are three other code points that originate from other East Asian standards: the Taiwanese small form variant, the CJK fullwidth form, and the Japanese emoji. The glyphs for these code points are typically larger or smaller than the primary code point, but the difference is mostly aesthetic or typographic, and the meanings of the symbols are the same.

 
 
 

However, for usage as the special character in various computing applications (see following sections), U+0024 is typically the only code that is recognized.

The symbol is not in the October 2019 'pipeline', but appears to be under active consideration. 

The following fonts display a double-bar dollar sign for code point 0024: regular-weight Baskerville, Big Caslon, Bodoni MT, Bradley Hand ITC, Brush Script MT, Garamond, STFangsong, STKaiti, and STSong ($).  

In LaTeX, with the textcomp package installed, the  can be input using the command \textdollaroldstyle. 

However, because of font substitution and the lack of a dedicated code point, the author of an electronic document who uses one of these fonts intending to represent a  cannot be sure that every reader will see a double-bar glyph rather than the single barred version.

Because of the continued lack of support in Unicode, a single bar dollar sign is frequently employed in its place even for official purposes. Where there is any risk of misunderstanding, the ISO 4217 three letter acronym is used.

Programming languages
  was used for defining string variables in older versions of the BASIC language, e.g.  ( was often pronounced "string" instead of "dollar" in this use).
  is prefixed to names to define variables in the PHP language and the AutoIt automation script language, scalar variables in the Perl language (see sigil (computer programming)), and global variables in the Ruby language.  In Perl programming this includes scalar elements of arrays  and hashes .
 In most shell scripting languages,  is used to indicate the insertion into strings of environment variables, special variables, input data fields, previous commands, arithmetic computations, and special characters, and for performing translation of localised strings. In the shell script languages of CP/M, DOS, and several Unix-like systems, it is used to insert variable information (such as the current working directory, user name, or sequential command number) in the command prompt.
  is used for defining hexadecimal constants in Pascal-like languages such as Delphi, and in some variants of assembly language.
  is used in the ALGOL 68 language to delimit transput format regions.
  is used in the TeX typesetting language to delimit mathematical regions.
 In many versions of FORTRAN 66,  could be used as an alternative to a quotation mark for delimiting strings.
 In PL/M,  can be used to put a visible separation between words in compound identifiers. For example,  refers to the same thing as 'SomeName'.
 In Haskell,  is used as a function application operator.
 In several JavaScript frameworks such as Prototype.js and jQuery,  is a common utility class, and is often referred to as the buck. Otherwise, it's a character allowed in identifiers.
 In JavaScript from ES6 onward it is used inside template literals to insert the value of a variable. For example, if  then  would equal 
 In C#,  marks a string literal as an interpolated string.
 In ASP.NET, the dollar sign used in a tag in the web page indicates an expression will follow it. The expression that follows is .NET language-agnostic, as it will work with C#, VB.NET, or any CLR supported language.
 In Erlang, the dollar sign precedes character literals. The dollar sign as a character can be written .
 In COBOL the  sign is used in the Picture clause to depict a floating currency symbol as the left most character.
 In some assembly languages, such as MIPS, the  sign is used to represent registers.
 In Honeywell 6000 series assembler, the  sign, when used as an address, meant the address of the instruction in which it appeared.
 In CMS-2, the  sign is used as a statement terminator.
 In R, the  sign is used as a subsetting operator. 
 In Q (programming language from Kx Systems), the  sign is used as a casting/padding/enumeration/conditional operator.
 In Sass, the  sign is prefixed to define a variable.

Operating systems
 In CP/M and subsequently in all versions of DOS (86-DOS, MS-DOS, PC DOS, more) and derivatives,  is used as a string terminator ( with ).
 In Microsoft Windows,  is appended to the share name to hide a shared folder or resource. For example,  will be visible to other computers on a network, while  will be accessible only by explicit reference. Hiding a shared folder or resource will not alter its access permissions but may render it inaccessible to programs or other functions which rely on its visibility. Most administrative shares are hidden in this way.
 In the LDAP directory access protocol,  is used as a line separator in various standard entry attributes such as postalAddress.
 In the UNIVAC EXEC 8 operating system,  means "system". It is appended to entities such as the names of system files, the "sender" name in messages sent by the operator, and the default names of system-created files (like compiler output) when no specific name is specified (e.g., etc.)
 In RISC OS,  is used in system variables to separate the application name from the variables specific to that application. For example Draw$Dir specifies the directory where the !Draw application is located. It is also used to refer to the root directory of a file system.

Applications
 Microsoft Excel and other spreadsheet software use the dollar sign ($) to denote a fixed row, fixed column reference, or an absolute cell reference.
 The dollar sign introduces a subfield delimiter in computer coding of library catalog records.
  matches the end of a line or string in sed, grep, and POSIX and Perl regular expressions, as well as the end of a line or the file in text editors ed, ex, vi, pico, and derivatives.

Other uses
The symbol is sometimes used derisively, in place of the letter S, to indicate greed or excess money such as in "Micro$oft", "Di$ney", "Chel$ea" and "GW$"; or supposed overt Americanisation as in "$ky". In 1872, Ambrose Bierce referred to California governor Leland Stanford as $tealand Landford.

In Scrabble notation, a dollar sign is placed after a word to indicate that it is valid according to the North American word lists, but not according to the British word lists.

A dollar symbol is used as unit of reactivity for a nuclear reactor,  being the threshold of slow criticality, meaning a steady reaction rate, while  is the threshold of prompt criticality, which means a nuclear excursion or explosion.

The dollar sign was used as a letter in the Turkmen alphabet from 1993 to 1999.

The dollar sign plays an important role in the plot of Ayn Rand's novel Atlas Shrugged, with the book's radical Free Market activists adopting it as their insignia.

See also 
 Cifrão
 Euro sign
 Indian rupee sign
 Pound sign
 Ruble sign
 Rupee sign
 Spanish dollar
 Turkish lira sign
 Yen sign
 Yuan sign
 Won sign

Explanatory notes

References

Citations

General and cited sources 

  Contains section on the history of the dollar sign, with much documentary evidence supporting the "pesos" hypothesis.

External links
 

Currency symbols
Numismatics

eu:$